Susie Power is an Irish teen actress and singer. She is best known for playing Eleanor Daly on Fair City. She is also known for her roles in  Dark Touch and Roy O'Brien in Little Roy.

Acting career

Early roles
Susie began her career at nine months old in a theatre production of The Lion King as Simba. She followed this up with additional theatre works The Dream Warp, The Lost Toys and The Naughty Elf.

Fair City
In 2008 Susie made her television debut on Irish soap Fair City. She played the role of Eleanor Daly until 2010.

She returned to the role in 2015. In late 2015/early 2016 a storyline involving her mother (played by Una Kavanagh) poisoning her drew a lot of controversy.

Throughout 2016 and 2017 Susie became involved in the "Katie Kidnapping" storyline working alongside her real life Uncle Johnny Ward. The storyline came to a conclusion in mid 2017. Susie returned to the soap in December 2018

Little Roy
Susie was cast in the lead role of Little Roy in 2015. Little Roy is a prequel to the BBC show Roy. The show ran for two seasons and has been broadcast worldwide.

World Championship of Performing Arts
In July 2015 Susie entered the World Championship of Performing Arts competition. It was held at the Long Beach Performing Arts Center in Long Beach, California. Susie had previously entered in 2014 and made it to the finals.

Singing career
Susie has sung on numerous stage shows through her career. In 2010 she performed on the reality show Glas Vegas show which was broadcast on TG4. 

She made an appearance in the "SPEAK UP against anti bullying" music video released in October 2016 by composers Ylva and Linda Persson.

Junior Eurovision 2016
Susie performed in the Junior Eurovision Song Contest 2016 qualifiers which began on 9 October on TG4. Although she was unsuccessful in qualifying for the next round, she has gone on to release her single 'Popsicle' on platforms like iTunes, and Spotify. A music video for the single has also appeared on YouTube.

Other media
Susie served as a presenter for kids show Hubble from 2010 to 2012. She has also appeared in numerous adverts for companies like Meteor and television interviews for Nationwide and News2Day on RTE.

In 2017, Susie appeared on the G Request Show with her uncle Johnny Ward discussing her career as an actress.

Filmography

Film

Television

Stage

References

 http://www.jammedia.com/shows/little-roy/
 http://www.kildarenow.com/features/co-kildare-schoolgirl-has-nation-glued-to-television-screens-as-she-is-being-drugged-by-crazy-mother/66648
 Susie winning Junior World Champion 2015 https://www.youtube.com/watch?v=KAzriPv53Ao
 Susie acting in the live finals WCOPA 2015 https://www.youtube.com/watch?v=geGw0KFjGScs

External links

 http://www.maureenvwardtalentagencyireland.com/index.php/menu-clients/teens/item/14-susiepower
 http://imdb.com/rg/an_share/name/name/nm3046545/
 https://www.facebook.com/SusiePowerOfficial/

2003 births
Living people
Actresses from County Dublin
Actresses from County Kildare
Irish child actresses